Arup Bhattacharya (born 20 January 1963) is an Indian former cricketer. He played 48 first-class matches for Bengal between 1980 and 1990.

See also
 List of Bengal cricketers

References

External links
 

1963 births
Living people
Indian cricketers
Bengal cricketers
Cricketers from Kolkata